Immune is the third studio album by Soul Embraced, released on February 25, 2003.

Critical reception

Awarding the album three stars from AllMusic, Alex Henderson states, "his CD is an exciting demonstration of the fact that Soul Embraced does not govern by brute force alone." Andy Shaw, giving the album a seven out of ten for Cross Rhythms, describes, "Soul Embraced have managed to put something of a new twist into it." Rating the album a three out of five at The Phantom Tollbooth, writes, "Immune is a step in the right direction for Soul-Embraced." Joe Quinlan of Jesus Freak Hideout states, "To be honest, I felt the entire album sounded the same, empty and slow. After Soul Embraced's last album came out (Dead Alive), I'd listen to that release any day over Immune. Also, considering the album was recorded in 2003, most kids are too much into Underoath and August Burns Red these days to enjoy Immune.

As for me, I still enjoy the album and anything Soul Embraced puts out. It's REAL metal, not a one-string melody, with a Drop-D break down. If you want a thrilling death metal record, purchase Dead Alive, but if you enjoy a simple yet original metal album to relax to, pick up Immune."

Track listing

Credits
 Soul Embraced
 Chad Moore - lead vocals
 Rocky Gray - guitar, bass, backing vocals
 Lance Garvin - drums

 Additional musicians
 John LeCompt - guest vocals on track 9

Production
 Troy Glessner - mastering
 Jason Magnusson - engineer, mixing, producer
 Brian May - composer
 Brian Meredith - photography
 Barry Poynter - engineer, mixing, producer

References

Soul Embraced albums
2003 albums
Solid State Records albums